The Sutherland Springs church shooting occurred on November 5, 2017, when Devin Patrick Kelley, of New Braunfels, Texas, perpetrated a mass shooting at the First Baptist Church in Sutherland Springs, Texas. Kelley killed 26 people, including an unborn child and wounded 22 others, before killing himself. The attack is the deadliest mass shooting in Texas history, and the fifth-deadliest in the United States. It was the deadliest shooting in an American place of worship, surpassing the Charleston church shooting of 2015 and the Waddell Buddhist temple shooting of 1991.

Kelley was prohibited by law from purchasing or possessing firearms and ammunition due to a domestic violence conviction in a court-martial while in the United States Air Force. The Air Force failed to record the conviction in the Federal Bureau of Investigation (FBI) National Crime Information Center database, which is used by the National Instant Check System to flag prohibited purchases. The error prompted the Air Force to begin a review.

Shooting
A few minutes after 11:00 a.m., Kelley arrived in a white SUV at the First Baptist Church in Sutherland Springs. Around 11:20a.m., Kelley stepped out of the SUV, wearing black tactical gear, a ballistic vest, and a black face-mask featuring a white skull, and wielding a Ruger AR-556 semi-automatic rifle. He approached the church from the right, opening fire on and killing two people outside the church and continuing to fire on the building itself. He then entered through a right side door, where worshipers were attending regular Sunday service.

Inside, Kelley yelled, "Everybody dies, motherfuckers", as he proceeded up and down the center aisle and shot at people in the pews. Police found 15 empty magazines capable of holding 30 rounds each. Authorities stated Kelley fired approximately 700 rounds during the estimated 11-minute long shooting.

According to investigators, the shooting was captured on a camera set up at the back of the church to record regular services for uploading online. The footage shows Kelley methodically shooting the victims, pausing only to reload his rifle.

Kelley was then confronted by and traded fire with Stephen Willeford, a local resident and former firearms instructor who was armed with an AR-15 semi-automatic rifle. Willeford had taken cover behind a truck across the street from the church and shot Kelley twice, once in the leg and once in the upper left torso under his tactical gear. Kelley, who had dropped his rifle during the initial firefight with Willeford, fired back with a handgun before fleeing in his Ford Explorer. Willeford fired one more round as Kelley sped north on FM 539. Willeford then noticed a pickup truck pulled up to the intersection of 4th St. and FM 539, driven by Johnnie Langendorff.

Willeford approached and entered Langendorff's truck on the passenger side. They then pursued Kelley at high speed for about five to seven minutes. While chasing Kelley, the men called police dispatch to report the route and direction of the chase assuming the police were headed toward the church.

During the chase, Kelley called his wife and spoke to her and his parents, informing them "I just shot up the Sutherland Springs church", and telling his father that he was injured and thought that he would not survive. Kelley reportedly repeatedly emphasized how sorry he was. Bleeding from his injuries, Kelley soon lost control of his vehicle, hitting a road sign before crossing a bar ditch at the Hartfield/Sandy Elm Road intersection and finally stopping about 30 feet into the field on the opposite side.

Willeford and Langendorff observed that he was motionless, and police took over the scene when they arrived. Police found Kelley dead in his car with three gunshot wounds, including a self-inflicted head wound. Two handguns were found in the vehicle: a Glock 19 9mm and a Ruger SR22 .22-caliber, both of which Kelley had purchased.

Victims

The attack occurred during the church's Sunday service. Twenty-six people were killed and 22 others were injured. The dead comprised ten women, seven men, seven girls, one boy, and an unborn child. Twenty-three died inside the church, two outside, and one in a hospital. The oldest victim was 77 years old. One victim was the 14-year-old daughter of church pastor Frank Pomeroy, who was elsewhere the day of the attack. Visiting pastor Bryan Holcombe died with eight family members, including an unborn grandchild.

The injured victims were taken to Connally Memorial Medical Center in Floresville, University Hospital in San Antonio, and Brooke Army Medical Center at Fort Sam Houston.

Investigation
The Texas Rangers led the investigation, with the FBI and the Bureau of Alcohol, Tobacco, Firearms and Explosives (ATF) assisting. Investigators said the shooting was not motivated by racism or prejudice against religion on the first day of the investigation, but by a dispute with Kelley's mother-in-law. There was no indication that anyone other than Kelley was involved in the shooting.

Perpetrator

At New Braunfels High, Kelley had a lengthy disciplinary record, which included seven suspensions for "falsifying records, insubordination, profanity and a drug-related offense". One former high school classmate described him as "an outcast but not a loner" who was "popular among other outcasts". However, a martial arts instructor who taught Kelley during that time said Kelley signed up for his class because he was being bullied and that he did not fit in. Kelley graduated in 2009 with a 2.32 grade-point average and a ranking of 260 out of 393 students in his class. A close friend from middle school through high school recalled "he wasn't always a 'psychopath' though" and that "over the years we all saw him change into something that he wasn't".

Military service and violent behavior
After graduating, Kelley enlisted in the United States Air Force. He served in logistics readiness at Holloman Air Force Base in New Mexico from 2009 until 2014. He married in April 2011. In October 2012, he was charged with assaulting his wife and fracturing his toddler stepson's skull. In response, Kelley made death threats against the superior officers who charged him, and he was caught sneaking firearms onto Holloman Air Force Base. Around that same time, he made threats of self-harm to a coworker. He was then admitted to Peak Behavioral Health Services, a mental health facility in Santa Teresa, New Mexico.

In June 2012, Kelley escaped from Peak Behavioral Health Services but was soon apprehended ten miles away at a bus terminal in El Paso, Texas. The facility's director of military affairs later recalled that Kelley had stayed at the facility for several weeks, until he was brought to court-martial. While there, he had expressed a desire for "some kind of retribution to his chain of command" and was discovered to have used computers to order "weapons and tactical gear to a P.O. box in San Antonio".

Kelley and his wife divorced in October 2012. In an interview with Inside Edition, his ex-wife said she lived in constant fear of him, as their marriage was filled with abuse. He once threatened her at gunpoint over a speeding ticket, and later threatened to kill her and her entire family.

Kelley was brought before a general court-martial on four charges: assault on his wife, aggravated assault on his stepson, two charges of pointing a loaded gun at his wife, and two counts of threatening his wife with an unloaded gun. In November 2012, Kelley pleaded guilty to two counts of Article 128 UCMJ, for the assault of his wife and stepson. In return, the weapons charges were dropped. He was sentenced to 12 months of confinement and a reduction in rank to airman basic. He appealed to the U.S. Court of Appeals for the Armed Forces, but was unsuccessful. In 2014, he was dismissed from the Air Force with a bad conduct discharge.

Personal life
After his release, Kelley returned to New Braunfels, where he lived in a converted barn at his parents' home. Shortly thereafter, he was investigated for sexual assault and rape, and for a physical assault of his then-girlfriend. A 2013 statement from the woman who accused Kelley of sexual assault detailed an alleged attack on her. A separate statement from Kelley's first wife (who divorced him in October 2012) said that Kelley had physically abused her during the marriage; the woman wrote, "For a whole year, he slapped me, choked me, kicked me, water-boarded me and held a gun to my head." However, the Comal County, Texas, Sheriff's Office did not bring charges against Kelley, and "the case became inactive because the victim did not respond to four follow-up calls and messages from a sheriff's office detective."

On April 4, 2014, Kelley married his then-girlfriend. The couple moved into a mobile home in Colorado Springs, Colorado, where he was charged in August 2014 for misdemeanor cruelty to animals after beating his malnourished husky. He was given a deferred sentence of probation and was ordered to pay restitution and other fees; the charge was dismissed in March 2016, after he completed the sentence. In January 2015, a resident of El Paso County, Colorado, was granted a protection order against him.

Kelley attended the First Baptist Church in Kingsville, Texas, from May to June 2014 and volunteered as a helper for one day of Vacation Bible School. Later on, he stopped volunteering at the summer Bible class and became vocally anti-religious, posting about atheism online. In social media posts, Kelley often tried to preach his atheism, described people who believe in God as "stupid" (his posts causing numerous former classmates to delete him as a friend on Facebook) and expressed an interest in church shootings.

At the time of the shooting, Kelley was again living at his parents' property in New Braunfels. He reportedly lied about his background to pass a background check and obtain a license from the Texas Department of Public Safety as a security guard, and was a security worker at the Summit Vacation and RV Resort in New Braunfels. He had previously worked as an unarmed security guard at the Schlitterbahn Waterpark and Resort in New Braunfels, but was fired after less than six weeks on the job. While he was working at The Summit Vacation and RV Resort, a family who encountered him commented on how "creepy" Kelley had seemed; one member described, "He seemed angry. He seemed annoyed by us, and he seemed like he wanted to exert some authority."

On the night of October 31, less than a week before the shooting, Kelley attended a festival at the First Baptist Church wearing all black. According to two parishioners who were at the festival, he acted so strangely that people had to keep an eye on him. One also examined him to make sure he was not carrying a firearm. According to a former Air Force colleague who temporarily got reacquainted with him online, Kelley claimed he would buy dogs and other animals and use them for "target practice". He also expressed his obsession with mass murders, including the Charleston church shooting, and joked about committing one himself. These comments prompted her to block him on Facebook.

Kelley's estranged second wife sometimes attended First Baptist Church in Sutherland Springs with her family. Prior to the shooting, he sent threatening text messages to her mother. His wife and her mother were not at the church when the attack occurred, but he killed his wife's grandmother at the church.

Ability to purchase and carry firearms
In 2012, Kelley purchased two guns (a European American Armory Windicator .38-caliber revolver and a 9mm SIG Sauer P250 pistol) from the HAFB Base Exchange.

Kelley later purchased four guns, including a 9mm Glock 19 pistol, a .22-caliber Ruger SR22 pistol, a Ruger GP100 .357 Magnum revolver and a Ruger AR-556 rifle, at stores in Colorado and Texas between 2014 and 2017. On October 29, a week before the shooting, he posted a photo of what appeared to be a Ruger model AR-556 rifle on his Facebook profile. A Ruger AR-556 rifle was used in the attack, and two handguns were found in Kelley's vehicle.

Kelley purchased the semi-automatic rifle used in the shooting from an Academy Sports + Outdoors store in San Antonio on April 7, 2016. He filled out the required ATF Form 4473 and falsely indicated that he did not have a disqualifying criminal history. In Texas, an FBI National Instant Criminal Background Check System (NICS) check is required at the time of purchase for all firearms except for purchasers with a valid license to carry a handgun.

The State of Texas denied his application for a license to carry a handgun. No license of any kind is required to purchase firearms under Texas state law.

Kelley's general court-martial guilty plea should have made it illegal for him to own, buy, or possess a firearm or ammunition. The conviction should have been flagged by NICS and prevented the purchase. Federal law prohibits those convicted of domestic violence–even if it is only a misdemeanor–from possessing firearms.

However, the Air Force failed to relay the court-martial convictions to the FBI. In a statement admitting the oversight, the Air Force said,  "Initial information indicates that Kelley's domestic violence offense was not entered into the National Crime Information Center (NCIC) database by the Holloman Air Force Base Office of Special Investigations." One day after the shooting, the Air Force said it had "launched a review of how the service handled the criminal records of former Airman Devin P. Kelley following his 2012 domestic violence conviction". Three days after the shooting, Vice President Mike Pence visited the crime scene, and said, "We will find why this information was not properly recorded in 2012, and we will work with leaders in Congress to ensure that this never happens again."

Aftermath

Lawsuits
In 2018, the family of a couple that was murdered in the shooting sued the U.S. Air Force and the Department of Defense, alleging they were negligent in reporting Kelley's criminal history, which would have prevented him from purchasing firearms. In 2021, a federal judge ruled that the federal government's negligence was mostly responsible for the shooting and that it was "jointly and severally liable for the damages that may be awarded." Damages were assessed by a federal judge at more than USD $230,000,000 "to survivors and victims’ families".

Legislation
The shooting brought attention to gaps in reporting to the federal background-check system intended to ban convicted domestic abusers, such as Kelley, from purchasing guns. Since 1996, the Lautenberg Amendment has prohibited the sale of firearms to those convicted of domestic abuse offenses, even misdemeanors, but gaps in reporting continue to exist.

On November 15, 2017, the day nine victims of the shooting were buried, Senator John Cornyn (R-TX) introduced the Fix NICS Act of 2017 (S.2135), to address deficiencies in the reporting process, and impose severe penalties for the failure of agencies to report convictions. The next day, Congressman Henry Cuellar (D-TX), whose district, Texas 28th, includes Sutherland Springs, introduced a version in the House of Representatives (H. R. 4434). Cuellar's bill was superseded by H. R. 4477, introduced by Congressman John Culberson (R-TX), representing Texas' 7th District, including western Houston and Harris County. The final version of the Fix NICS ACT was passed as part of the Consolidated Appropriations Act, 2018, signed as Pub.L.115-141 by President Donald Trump on March 23, 2018. A week later, Cornyn met with survivors and victims' families at the First Baptist Church in Sutherland Springs to discuss details of the legislation. Between November 5, 2017, and March 30, 2018, the U. S. Air Force turned over at least 4,000 outstanding records to the FBI.

Reactions

Donald Trump, who was the 45th president of the United States at the time of the shooting, said at a press conference in Tokyo, Japan that "I think that mental health is a problem here. Based on preliminary reports, this was a very deranged individual with a lot of problems over a very long period of time. We have a lot of mental health problems in our country, as do other countries, but this isn't a guns situation ... we could go into it but it's a little bit soon to go into it. Fortunately somebody else had a gun that was shooting in the opposite direction, otherwise it wouldn’t have been as bad as it was, it would have been much worse". Trump was asked about gun policy while visiting Seoul, South Korea. In response to a proposal for extreme vetting of gun ownership, Trump said that this would have made "no difference". He said that stricter gun control measures might have prevented Stephen Willeford from shooting Kelley, and commented, "Instead of having 26 dead, he would've had hundreds more dead." After the shooting, Trump issued a presidential proclamation honoring the victims and ordered the United States flag at half-staff at the White House and all public and military sites until the sunset of November 9. Willeford was called a hero for what he did.

Texas Governor Greg Abbott said that the shooting "will be a long, suffering mourning for those in pain". Texas Attorney General Ken Paxton proposed that churches employ professional armed security guards, or at least arm more parishioners, to counter church shootings, which he said have happened "forever" and will again. Paxton was criticized by Manny Garcia, the Texas Democratic Party's deputy executive director, who said that "Texans deserve more from their chief law enforcement official."

On November 9, the pastor of the church, Frank Pomeroy, announced that the building would be demolished and be replaced with a prayer garden, stating that it would be too painful to the victims to keep the building as is. Later in the month he told the New York Times that reports of the church being demolished were inaccurate, and that a decision on the future of the church had not yet been made.

Conspiracy theories and harassment of victims' families
Fake news websites and far-right agitators promoted misleading and deceptive stories along with conspiracy theories about the incident. They associated the shooter with a range of people and groups the far-right opposes such as identifying him as a Democrat, Hillary Clinton supporter, Bernie Sanders supporter, alt-left supporter, or radical Muslim; or claiming that he carried an antifa flag and told churchgoers, "This is a communist revolution!" Some reports falsely claimed that he targeted the church because they were "white conservatives". Democratic U.S. Representative Vicente González twice incorrectly named the shooter as "Sam Hyde", a comedian who is often jokingly referred to as the perpetrator on social media. González said that he had been given that name by officials.

Conspiracy theories circulated at the hospital where victims were being treated. According to The Washington Post, a group of women who said they knew the victims were overheard discussing the shooting as a false flag operation designed to manipulate the public towards some nefarious end. The Post reporter sought to inquire further, but the women pushed her away, saying, "She [the reporter] is part of it [the conspiracy]," after which the reporter was removed from the hospital by police. The misinformation mirrored similar events in the aftermath of the Las Vegas shooting a few weeks earlier, in which perpetrator Stephen Paddock was falsely linked to leftist and Islamist groups.

In 2018, two conspiracy theorists, Jodi Mann and Robert Ussery, were arrested after accosting the church's pastor, whose daughter was killed in the shooting. Both were charged with trespassing and resisting arrest, and Ussery was also charged with making a terroristic threat and possession of marijuana. Mann and Ussery deny that the massacre occurred and instead promote "false flag" conspiracy notions on the Internet, asserting that the Sutherland Springs attack and other attacks were orchestrated for political purposes.

See also
 Gun violence in the United States
 Gun law in the United States
 Gun politics in the United States
 List of rampage killers in the United States
 List of shootings in Texas
 Anti-Christian sentiment

Notes

References

External links

 First Baptist Church website
 CNN list of victims fatally shot

2017 active shooter incidents in the United States
2017 crimes in Texas
2017 in Christianity
2017 mass shootings in the United States
2017 murders in the United States
21st-century mass murder in the United States
Antireligion
Antitheism
Articles containing video clips
Atheism and violence
Attacks in the United States in 2017
Attacks on churches in North America
Attacks on religious buildings and structures in the United States
Baptist Christianity in Texas
Deaths by firearm in Texas
Defensive gun use
Filmed killings
Filmed murder–suicides
Mass murder in 2017
Mass murder in Texas
Mass murder in the United States
Mass shootings in Texas
Mass shootings in the United States
Massacres in religious buildings and structures
Massacres in the United States
Massacres of Christians
Murder–suicides in Texas
November 2017 crimes in the United States
Religion and atheism
Violence against Christians
Wilson County, Texas